Hamid Merakchi (born 28 January 1976) is an Algerian footballer.

Merakchi spent most of his career in Algeria, but had a spell with Gençlerbirliği where he played in 26 Turkish Super Lig matches.

Merakchi also made several appearances for the Algeria national football team, including two qualifying matches for the 2000 African Nations Cup finals.

National team statistics

International goals
Scores and results list Algeria's goal tally first.

References

External links

1976 births
Living people
People from Aïn Témouchent
Algerian footballers
Algeria international footballers
Algeria under-23 international footballers
Gençlerbirliği S.K. footballers
CR Témouchent players
WA Tlemcen players
USM El Harrach players
MC Oran players
MC Alger players
Expatriate footballers in Turkey
Algerian expatriate footballers
2000 African Cup of Nations players
Algerian expatriate sportspeople in Turkey
Süper Lig players
ES Mostaganem players
WA Mostaganem players
Competitors at the 1997 Mediterranean Games
Association football forwards
Mediterranean Games competitors for Algeria
21st-century Algerian people